This article provides information on candidates who stood for the 1974 Australian federal election. The election was held on 18 May 1974.

Redistributions and seat changes
Redistributions of electoral boundaries occurred in Western Australia and the Australian Capital Territory.
In Western Australia, a new seat, Tangney (notionally Labor), was created.
The division of Australian Capital Territory was split into divisions, Canberra and Fraser, both notionally Labor. The member for the ACT, Kep Enderby (Labor), contested Canberra.

Retiring Members and Senators

Labor
 Fred Birrell MP (Port Adelaide, SA)
Senator Harry Cant (WA)
Senator Joe Fitzgerald (NSW)
Senator Bob Poke (Tas)
Senator Laurie Wilkinson (WA)

Liberal
 Les Bury MP (Wentworth, NSW)
 Marshall Cooke MP (Petrie, Qld)
 Sir John Cramer MP (Bennelong, NSW)
 Harry Turner MP (Bradfield, NSW)
 Ray Whittorn MP (Balaclava, Vic)
Senator Dame Nancy Buttfield (SA)
Senator Elliot Lillico (Tas)

Democratic Labor
Senator Vince Gair (Qld)

Independent
Senator Reg Turnbull (Tas)

House of Representatives
Sitting members at the time of the election are shown in bold text. Successful candidates are highlighted in the relevant colour. Where there is possible confusion, an asterisk (*) is also used.

Australian Capital Territory

New South Wales

Northern Territory

Queensland

South Australia

Tasmania

Victoria

Western Australia

Senate
Sitting Senators are shown in bold text. Since this was a double dissolution election, all senators were up for re-election. The first five successful candidates from each state were elected to a six-year term, the remaining five to a three-year term. Tickets that elected at least one Senator are highlighted in the relevant colour. Successful candidates are identified by an asterisk (*).

New South Wales
Ten seats were up for election. The Labor Party was defending six seats. The Liberal-Country Coalition was defending three seats. The Democratic Labor Party was defending one seat.

Queensland

Ten seats were up for election. The Labor Party was defending four seats. The Liberal-Country Coalition was defending four seats. The Democratic Labor Party was defending two seats.

South Australia

Ten seats were up for election. The Labor Party was defending five seats. The Liberal Party was defending five seats.

Tasmania

Ten seats were up for election. The Labor Party was defending four seats. The Liberal Party was defending four seats. Independent Senator Michael Townley was defending one seat. One seat had been held by Independent Senator Reg Turnbull.

Victoria

Ten seats were up for election. The Labor Party was defending three seats. The Liberal-Country Coalition was defending five seats (although Liberal Senator George Hannan was contesting the election for the National Liberal Party). The Democratic Labor Party was defending two seats.

Western Australia

Ten seats were up for election. The Labor Party was defending four seats. The Liberal Party was defending three seats. The National Alliance, an amalgamation of the Country Party and the DLP, was defending two seats. Independent Senator Syd Negus was defending one seat.

Summary by party 

Beside each party is the number of seats contested by that party in the House of Representatives for each state, as well as an indication of whether the party contested the Senate election in the respective state.

See also
 1974 Australian federal election
 Members of the Australian House of Representatives, 1972–1974
 Members of the Australian House of Representatives, 1974–1975
 Members of the Australian Senate, 1971–1974
 Members of the Australian Senate, 1974–1975
 List of political parties in Australia

References
Adam Carr's Election Archive - House of Representatives 1974
Adam Carr's Election Archive - Senate 1974

1974 in Australia
Candidates for Australian federal elections